Space Master is a science fiction role-playing game produced by Iron Crown Enterprises, written by Kevin Barrett and developed by Kevin Barrett and Terry K. Amthor.

History
Iron Crown Enterprises published Spacemaster in 1985. ICE published their new Spacemaster: Privateers RPG (2000) while in chapter 11. ICE's last remaining role-playing lines - Rolemaster, Spacemaster and Shadow World – as well as the ICE brand itself were all that was left by 2001, and everything that was left was sold to John R. Seal of London for $78,000; those rights were then placed into Aurigas Aldebaron LLC, which is a holding company that takes on no debt and is solely intended to hold the ICE properties. Shortly after purchasing the ICE rights, Aurigas licensed them out to a company interested in continuing ICE's production: Phoenix LLC, which shortly after became Mjolnir LLC; although the original ICE was gone, Mjolnir began doing business as "ICE", using the company's IPs and brand. Mjolnir restarted the Spacemaster: Privateers line, which updated the Spacemaster mechanics to be more like the Rolemaster Standard System mechanics. As problems developed with the ICE brand, Aurigas Aldebaron decided to pull all of Mjolnir's ICE-related rights, and after recovering the ICE IPs from Mjolnir, Aurigas licensed the rights to HARP, Rolemaster and Spacemaster to Guild Companion Publications.

Publication history
Space Master was designed by Kevin Barrett and Terry K. Amthor, with a cover by Gail McIntosh and illustrations by Jason Waltrip and Dan Carroll, and was published by Iron Crown Enterprises in 1985 as a boxed set with two books (one 96 pages, one 88 pages), a 16-page pamphlet, three color maps, and a counter sheet. The second edition was published in 1986; a third edition with a cover by Walter Velez was published in 1988 as a boxed set which included three books (one 128 pages, one 96 pages, one 80 pages), and two color maps. There was also a second edition reprint in 1992 in a combined softcover book ( ICE2600 #9050).

Contents
Space Master is a science-fiction space-adventure system, fairly complex, and compatible with Cyberspace, Rolemaster, and to a lesser extent Middle-earth Role Playing. The first and second editions included the "Future Law" and "Tech Law" book, a booklet of spaceship plans, plus maps and counters for spaceship combat. The third edition (which the publisher calls the second edition) is revised and expanded, with three new booklets. The "Player Book" (128 pages) covers: character creation (a detailed class-and-level system); a complex and comprehensive combat system; skills and activity resolution; and extensive psionic powers rules. The "GM Book" (80 pages) covers: star system and planet creation; 40 pages of background data on the Empire, a far-future interstellar realm; guidelines for alternate milieus; how to run adventures and create encounters; and information on alien races. The "Tech Book" (96 pages) covers all sorts of futuristic equipment, including weapons, tools, armor, computers, robots, clones and cyborgs, vehicles, and spaceships (including deck plans for nine examples); also includes malfunction and repair rules and detailed charts of weapon effects. The third edition boxed set also includes a two-piece color star map of the Empire.

Description
Spacemaster is an adaptation of, and mostly compatible with, the Rolemaster Fantasy Roleplaying system, and as such any perceived failings/strengths of the latter also apply to Space Master. Spacemaster is available in two editions, namely Spacemaster 2nd Edition (analogous and broadly compatible with Rolemaster 2nd Edition and Rolemaster Classic) and Spacemaster Privateers (analogous and compatible with Rolemaster Standard System and Rolemaster Fantasy Role Playing).

Iron Crown Enterprises has published several expansions, including Space Master Companion I, Space Master Companion II and Aliens & Artifacts, as well as numerous adventure modules and setting sourcebooks. A cyberpunk adaptation of the system, called Cyberspace was also published, along with a smaller number of supplements.

Spacemaster 2

The Space Master System is usable in a variety of SF environments, from a black near future of post-holocaust Earth, to a culture of high-tech exploration, to a distant time where civilization has fallen to superstitious ruin. Spacemaster has 17 professions, dozens of sub-professions, over 120 skills and a rich selection of background options.

Spacemaster Trilogy: 
 1. Space Master: The Role Playing Game is completely compatible with all Space Master Modules, and is the first part of a Science Fiction Gaming Trilogy. 
 2. Space Master: Star Strike (Fall 1988), a fast-paced game of interplanetary ship combat, puts you in the gunner’s chair as you face enemy starships. 
 3. Space Master: Armored Assault (Winter 1988-89), moves the combat planetside, where Hovertanks, Powered Armor, and Aircraft vie for supremacy. 
 Note: Space Master can also be integrated with Rolemaster; used together they set the stage for sweeping, coherent, science-fantasy campaigns.

The default setting for Spacemaster 2 is the classic Imperium setting, where a human empire spans the galaxy in a future thousands of years hence. Noble houses, megacorporations, and other organisations vie for influence and more in a setting rich in transhumans, robots, psionics, aliens, and other exotica.

Reception
The Games Machine reviewed Space Master - The Roleplaying Game and stated that "Not everyone will like Space Master. The rules make few concessions to ease of learning, and players without experience of other roles will have a really tough time. But as a detailed, flexible, science-fiction system it has a lot to commend it."

References

Iron Crown Enterprises games
Space opera role-playing games
Role-playing games introduced in 1985